The  11th Armored Division (11 AD) was a division of the United States Army in World War II. It was activated on 15 August 1942 at Camp Polk, Louisiana and moved on 24 June 1943 for the Louisiana Maneuvers. Transferred then to Camp Barkeley, Texas on 5 September 1943, the division participated, beginning 29 October 1943, in the California Maneuvers and arrived at Camp Cooke California on 11 February 1944.  The division staged at Camp Kilmer, New Jersey from 16 to 29 September 1944 until departing New York Port of Embarkation on 29 September 1944, arriving in England on 11 October 1944.

The 11 AD landed in France on 16 December 1944, crossed into Belgium on 29 December, and entered Germany on 5 March 1945. The 11th Armored Division was disbanded in August 1945.

Commanders
Commanders of the 11th Armored Division were:

Major General Edward H. Brooks, August 1942 – March 1944
Brigadier General Charles S. Kilburn, March 1944 – March 1945
Brigadier General (later Major General) Holmes E. Dager, March 1945 – May 1945

Combat chronicle
The division was activated on 15 August 1942. It arrived in England 11 October 1944 and prepared for combat with two months' training on the Salisbury Plain. The division landed in Normandy on 16 December 1944, assigned to contain the enemy in the Lorient Pocket, but the onset of the Battle of the Bulge resulted in a forced march to the Meuse and the defense of a 30-mile sector from Givet to Sedan, 23 December. Launching an attack from Neufchâteau, Belgium, 30 December, the 11th defended the highway to Bastogne against fierce assault.

An eyewitness account by John Fague of B Company, 21st Armored Infantry Battalion of the 11th Armored Division, describes the killing of 80 German prisoners by American soldiers at the Chenogne massacre "Machine guns were being set up. These boys were to be machine gunned and murdered. We were committing the same crimes we were now accusing the Japanese and Germans of doing".

The division acted as spearhead of a wedge into the enemy line, and its junction with the First Army at Houffalize, Belgium, 16 January 1945, created a huge trap. After the liquidation of the Bulge, the Siegfried Line was pierced, Lützkampen falling 7 February, Grosskampenberg on the 17th, and the key point, Roscheid, 20 February.

After a brief rest, the division crossed the Prum and Kyll Rivers, taking Gerolstein and Nieder Bettingen against violent opposition. Andernach and Brohl fell 9 March, in the sweep to the Rhine. In the swing southward to clear the Saar-Moselle-Rhine pocket, the Moselle River was crossed at Bullay and the Worms Airport captured, 21 March.

After rest and maintenance, the division drove across the Rhine at Oppenheim, took Hanau and Fulda, and headed for the Thuringian Forest, reaching Oberhof, 3 April. The offensive raced through Bavaria, Coburg falling on the 10th, Bayreuth on the 14th.

In the final drive, the division crossed the Regen river, 24 April, overran Grafenau and Freyung, and plunged toward the Danube, seizing Rohrbach, Neufelden, and Zwettl. The enemy put up its last significant resistance along the approaches to Linz, Austria, but the 11th entered that city, 5 May. Pushing onward, elements contacted Soviet forces, 8 May, the first unit of the Third Army, to meet the Soviet Red Army.

On 5 May 1945, elements of the US 11th Armored Division liberated the Mauthausen concentration camp.

The war in Europe officially ended 9 May, and the division was placed on occupational duty until it was disbanded on 31 August 1945.

Composition 
The division was composed of the following units:

 Headquarters
 Headquarters Company
 Combat Command A
 Combat Command B
 Combat Command Reserve
 22nd Tank Battalion
 41st Tank Battalion
 42nd Tank Battalion
 21st Armored Infantry Battalion
 55th Armored Infantry Battalion
 63rd Armored Infantry Battalion
 Headquarters and Headquarters Battery, 11th Armored Division Artillery
 490th Armored Field Artillery Battalion
 491st Armored Field Artillery Battalion
 492nd Armored Field Artillery Battalion
 41st Cavalry Reconnaissance Squadron (Mechanized)
 56th Armored Engineer Battalion
 151st Armored Signal Company
 Headquarters and Headquarters Company, 11th Armored Division Trains
 133rd Ordnance Maintenance Battalion
 81st Armored Medical Battalion
 Military Police Platoon
 Band

Casualties
Total battle casualties: 2,877
Killed in action: 432
Wounded in action: 2,394
Missing in action: 11
Prisoner of war: 40

References

External links

 European Center of Military History Order of Battle 11th Armd Division
 Thunderbolt: The Story of the 11th Armored Division (World War II unit history booklet)
 The 11th Armored Division Association
 Fact Sheet of the 11th Armored Division from http://www.battleofthebulge.org
 Hartman, J. Ted. Tank Driver: With the 11th Armored from the Battle of the Bulge to VE Day. Bloomington: Indiana University Press, 2014.

11th Armored Division, U.S.
Armored Division, U.S. 11th
Military units and formations established in 1942
1942 establishments in the United States
1942 establishments in Louisiana
Military units and formations disestablished in 1945